Rhynchopyga castra is a species of moth in the subfamily Arctiinae. It was described by E. Dukinfield Jones in 1912. It is found in Brazil.

References

Moths described in 1912
Euchromiina